The 2011 PTT Pattaya Open was a women's professional tennis tournament played on outdoor hard courts. It was the 20th edition of the PTT Pattaya Open (formerly known as the Pattaya Women's Open) and was part of the International category on the 2011 WTA Tour. It took place at Dusit Thani Hotel in Pattaya, Thailand from February 6 through February 13, 2011.

WTA entrants

Seeds

1 Rankings as of January 31, 2011.

Other entrants
The following players received wildcards into the main draw:
 Noppawan Lertcheewakarn
 Nicha Lertpitaksinchai
 Nudnida Luangnam

The following players received entry from the qualifying draw:

 Zarina Diyas
 Ksenia Palkina
 Galina Voskoboeva
 Nungnadda Wannasuk

Champions

Singles

 Daniela Hantuchová defeated  Sara Errani, 6–0, 6–2.
 It was Hantuchová's first title of the year, and fourth of her career.

Doubles

 Sara Errani /  Roberta Vinci defeated  Sun Shengnan /  Zheng Jie, 3–6, 6–3, [10–5].

External links

 
 WTA Tour
 in women's tennis
Tennis, WTA Tour, PTT Pattaya Open
Tennis, WTA Tour, PTT Pattaya Open

Tennis, WTA Tour, PTT Pattaya Open